The rigouta is a Tunisian fresh soft cheese, produced mainly in the city of Béja. The cheese is a close relative to the Italian ricotta and is made with the whey of Sicilo-Sarda sheep.

Production and Usage

The whey is heated at 80-90 °C to coagulate the proteins (albumins and globulins), the result is then drained in small traditional straw baskets, a clean fabric, or a perforated recipient made of plastic or metal. The main micro-organisms responsible of the fermentation are: the Lactococcus lactis and the Enterococcus faecalis.

Rigouta is also used as the basis of several preparations and dishes of Tunisian cuisine.

References

Arab cuisine
Tunisian cuisine
Whey cheeses